Grabovac Banski is a village in central Croatia, in the Town of Petrinja, Sisak-Moslavina County. It is connected by the D30 highway.

History
On 23 July 1941, the first armed action by the antifascist partisans in Banija region, and in Croatia as a whole, was conducted in Banski Grabovac, under the leadership of Vasilj Gaćeša. In Ustaša reprisals against civilian population, that followed shortly, about 1200 civilians were killed in the Banski Grabovac massacre. There are two monuments in this area, the Monument of the Uprising and Monument to the Victims of Fascism, by Petar Salopek, featuring the lyrics of Croatian poet Jure Kaštelan.

Demographics
According to the 2011 census,  the village of Grabovac Banski has 200 inhabitants. This represents 36.23% of its pre-war population according to the 1991 census.

According to the 1991 census,  88.04% of the village population were ethnic Serbs (486/552),  4.71% were ethnic Croats (26/552), 5.62% were Yugoslavs  (31/552), while 1.63% were of other ethnic origin (9/552).

Sights
 The Monument of the Uprising and Monument to the Victims of Fascism, by Petar Salopek, featuring the lyrics of Croatian poet Jure Kaštelan.

Notable people

References

Populated places in Sisak-Moslavina County
Serb communities in Croatia